Unqualified is an American advice podcast created and hosted by actress Anna Faris, featuring interviews with celebrities and cultural figures, followed by personal phonecalls to listeners asking for relationship and other advice. It was co-hosted by Faris's producer Sim Sarna until 2019. In 2017, Faris published a memoir under the same name as the podcast.

Concept
Faris was inspired to create the podcast after listening to Serial. Explaining the evolution of the idea, she said: 
I love to talk about relationships; that’s all I want to talk about with my friends. And then I just thought, I kind of want a hobby, since [my husband] Chris has been shooting a lot. So I started asking around to some friends, and I asked this technical producer guy what equipment I should buy on Amazon. And I just started recording my friends when they would come over. And then with my dear friend Sim, we started flushing out the whole thing, which clearly there’s still a lot more flushing out to do. It started out as a dinky hobby. It still is, for sure—we don’t make any money. We would love to at some point, but we want to know a little bit more what we’re doing first.

Format
Each episode has two parts. In the first, a guest interview, Faris sometimes incorporates ad libbing or improvisational comedic sketches with the guest, and posts questions centered on hypothetical relationship or dating situations. In some segments, she plays the character of Karen Sarducci, a disaffected studio executive with pronounced vocal fry who often makes reference to her privileged, brilliant sons, Milo (Paul Scheer) and Ventimiglia (based in name on actor Milo Ventimiglia), who are often vacationing abroad or at music festivals such as Coachella.

The second part of the show consisted of Faris and Former producer Sim Sarna, and the guest placing a phone call to a listener who has a relationship or personal dilemma and seeks "unqualified" advice. Since leaving this segment is conducted primarily by Anna and guests.

Persons involved

Hosts and recurring persons
Anna Farismain host; also plays various characters during improvised segments. 
Michael Barrettexecutive producer
Rob Holyszexecutive producer
Jeph Porterexecutive producer
 Kasper Bræin Selvigproducer

Production services
 Rabbit Grin ProductionsRabbit Grin Productions

Former host and producer
 Sim Sarnaformer producer and co-host (no longer involved as of the March 7, 2019 episode).

Characters
Karen Sarducci (Anna Faris)an insouciant studio executive who interviews actor guests about potential film ideas
Donavan (Sim Sarna)Karen Sarducci's put-upon assistant, who often tries to engage in the general meetings but is promptly told to 'shut the F**K up'
Milo (Paul Scheer)spoiled and verbally-abusive son of Karen Sarducci
Chad (Anna Faris) an emotionally manipulative and oblivious boyfriend who engages in self-defensive arguments with female guests
Kayla (Anna Faris)an imposing and desperate aspiring actress who attempts to ingratiate herself with show guests

Episodes

First Episode was originally with Allison Janney, but was later removed supposedly due to explicit content.

Accolades
Winner: Shorty Awards (2017) for Best Podcast
Nominated: iHeartRadio Podcast Awards (2019) for Best comedy Podcast

Notes

References

External links
 

Audio podcasts
2015 podcast debuts
Shorty Award winners
Advice podcasts 
American podcasts